Vozdukh is a Russian literary magazine published four times per year, that features poetry and critical essays. The editor-in-chief is Dmitry Kuzmin, the designer is Yuri Gordon.

History
The magazine was established in 2006. Its title translates as "air" and refers to a passage from Osip Mandelstam, who viewed genuine poetry as stolen air, which doesn't ask anyone's permission to exist.

References

External links
 

Literary magazines published in Russia
Magazines published in Russia
Magazines established in 2006